María Miterloi Hernández (24 March 1930 – 11 June 1993), better known by her stage name Maruja Montes, was a Brazilian-born Argentine actress and vedette who performed during the middle part of the 20th century.

Biography
Montes was born on 24 March 1930 in São Paulo, Brazil. She came to Argentina with her mother, María Magdalena Rosario Garrido, and brother Agustín Hernández and became a naturalized Argentine citizen. She was a showgirl in the burlesque and comedy theaters of Argentina in the 1950s and made ten films. She committed suicide on 11 June 1993 in Buenos Aires, Argentina.

Filmography
 Noche flamenca (1946)
 Marido de ocasión (1952) 
 Ésta es mi vida (1952)
 Trompada 45 (1953)
 Corazón fiel (1954)
 Vida nocturna (1955)
 Los hermanos corsos (1955)
 Bacará (1955) .... Yvonne
 Estrellas de Buenos Aires (1956)
 Historia de una carta (1957)
 La potranca (1960)

References

1930 births
1993 deaths
Brazilian vedettes
Brazilian actresses
Brazilian emigrants to Argentina
People from São Paulo
Suicides in Argentina
1993 suicides